McCowan can refer to the following:

McCowan Baronets, British baronetcy
Millar McCowan, Scottish confectionery company
McCowan (surname)
McCowan Road, a major thoroughfare in Scarborough, Toronto, Ontario, Canada.
 A local name for York Regional Road 67 in York Region, Ontario, Canada.
McCowan (TTC), a station of the Scarborough RT line in Toronto
McCowan's, Scottish confectionery company